Paralympic alpine skiing has been competed at the Winter Paralympic Games since they were first held in 1976. Events include men's and women's downhill, Super G, giant slalom, slalom, and combined.

Since the 2006 Winter Games in Torino, a three category system is used. The three categories are: sitting, standing and visually impaired.

Summary

Events

Medal table
 NPCs in italics no longer compete at the Winter Paralympics

As of 2022 Winter Paralympics

Multiple medalists

The table shows athletes with either 6 or more gold medals or ten or more total medals.

Nations

See also

 Alpine skiing at the Winter Olympics
 Alpine skiing at the Youth Olympic Games
 Alpine skiing World Cup
 FIS Alpine World Ski Championships
 World Para Alpine Skiing Championships

References

 
Sports at the Winter Paralympics
Paralympics